CCN University of Science and Technology is a private university in Kotbari, Comilla Sadar Dakshin Upazila, Comilla District, Bangladesh, established in 2014. It was founded by Md. Tariqul Islam Chowdhury. Founder board of trustees, Abdul Matin Khasru, Member of Parliament and former Law minister also politician of Bangladesh Awami League.

As of August 2021, Md. Musharaf Hossain was working as the vice-chancellor of the university.

See also
 List of Educational Institutions in Comilla

References

Universities and colleges in Cumilla District
Private universities in Bangladesh